This article displays the squads of the teams that competed in EuroBasket 2015. Each team includes of 12 players.

Age and club as of the start of the tournament, 5 September 2015.

Group A

Bosnia and Herzegovina

Finland

France

Israel

Poland

Russia

}

Group B

Germany

Italy

Iceland

Serbia

Spain

Turkey

Group C

Croatia

Georgia

Greece

North Macedonia

Netherlands

Slovenia

Group D

Belgium

Czech Republic
}

Estonia

Latvia

Lithuania

Ukraine

References

External links
Official website

squads
2015